Gunahon Ka Devta (lit. The God of Crimes) is a 1949 Hindi novel by Dharamvir Bharati. The story is set in Allahabad during the British rule in India. The story has four main characters: Chandar, Sudha, Vinti and Pammi.

Over time, the novel gained historical importance and a cult following of readers. The story is about a young student, Chander, who falls in love with Sudha, the daughter of his college professor. It was published by Bhartiya Jnanpith Trust and its 55th edition was published in 2009.

This is Dharamvir Bharati's most famous work, and it earned him a huge fan-following especially in the contemporary youth, as well as several awards and accolades, thus making him one of the most recognised names in Hindi Literature following Munshi Premchand.

Overview
It is primarily the story of "non expressive love and romance between two characters (Chandar and Sudha)" showing various trappings of love in urban middle-class, pre-independence India and the emotional conflicts of enthusiastic, ambitious and idealistic youth.

In the novels foreword, the author says, "While writing this novel I experienced the feeling one has during depressing moments when he prays fervently, with full faith.... It appears as if the very same prayer has been ingrained in my heart and I am still repeating it..."

The novel tells the passionate love story of Chander and Sudha and is set in Allahabad just after Partition. Chandrakumar Kapoor "Chander", an orphan, is a young researcher and has a mentor in Dr. Shukla, a widower and a professor. Chander is close to Sudha, Dr. Shukla's daughter. The two share a relationship that is deep and strong, and their attraction for each other increases with the passage of time. That Sudha is in love with Chander is clear to Sudha's best friend, Gesu, and Sudha's cousin Binti. Chander is from a lower caste than Sudha and so he doesn't dare ask for Sudha's hand in marriage from her father. While Sudha seems to be fairly 'modern', she cannot stand up to the social pressure of having to agree to marry the man of her father's choice; Chander also forces her to abide by the wishes of her father.

The writer uses this love story to hold a mirror to society's socioeconomic divide. Bharati highlights an important point here; while children are taught to follow the values of the society they are born in, and are judged on their ability to make choices according to those standards, it is sometimes psychologically corrosive for people to keep following those ideals. In those moments, resistance against such ideas becomes not only the pragmatic choice for an individual but it is also the only way for societies to move forward.

Chandar has a choice: should he snatch Sudha from the clutches of social taboos or should he let her go and sacrifice his love at the altar of ‘good’ behaviour?

Chandar makes the socially acceptable choice and the consequences of this result in him becoming fully aware of his feelings for Sudha. The agony of an unattainable love burns him up slowly. His calm and rational outlook towards life is replaced by a longing to untie the jumble of his emotions. At this point he turns to Pammi, a Christian girl, to explore the physical aspect of love which was hitherto unknown to him. When even the physical expression of love cannot alleviate his agony he turns to Binti in search of an emotional connection that really isn't there. With the passage of time, it becomes abundantly clear that his heart longs only for Sudha and no one can replace her in his life.

The writer also suggests that in such a restrictive society, young adults are bound to develop romantic feelings for anyone from the opposite sex whom they get a chance to interact with on a regular basis because they have limited options. While they have been exposed to the modern concept of a loving relationship between two adults, society still considers marriage a sort of bond of compromise rather than a fulfilling relationship.

Adaptations
In 1969, a movie named ‘Ek tha Chander Ek thi Sudha’ was partially shot. The movie starred Amitabh Bachchan and Jaya Bhaduri. It was an adaptation of this novel. However the movie got shelved. 

In 2015, Garima Productions produced a television adaptation of the novel. The show was titled Ek Tha Chander Ek Thi Sudha aired on Life OK and became available on web portal  Hotstar. The show starred actor Rahil Azim and Umang Jain in lead roles.

Publication
 Gunaho Ka Devta, by Dharmveer Bharti published by Bhartiya Jnanpith. .

References

External links
 Gunaho Ka Devta at Dharmveer Bharti website.
 Gunaho Ka Devta Excerpts
 

Hindi-language novels
1949 novels
Indian novels adapted into films
1949 Indian novels
1949 debut novels